Ab-i Istada ("standing water") is an endorheic salt lake  in Nawa District, Ghazni Province, Afghanistan.

Description
It is very shallow, not exceeding  in depth. There are two small islands near the lake's southeastern shore, Loya ghundai and Kuchney ghundai. The water is highly alkaline and mass die-offs of freshwater fish from the Ghazni River sometimes occur.

The main inflows into Ab-i Istada are the Ghazni, Sardeh and Nahara Rivers, which drain into it from the northeast. At high water levels, the lake is known to overflow into the Lora River, a tributary of the Arghistan River, through two channels on the south side of the lake, Akasi Mandeh and Sekva Mandeh. A groundwater connection between the lake and the Lora drainage has been suggested.

Settlement
Historically the area around the lake was unpopulated, although nomads from Kandahar visited it in the summer. More recently, the Tarakai have settled near the lake: in 2003 there were eight villages within  with a total population of approximately 5000. Economic activities around the lake include trapping of saker and peregrine falcons, grazing and collection of fuel wood.

Environment
The wetlands around Ab-i Istada attract a variety of migratory birds, over 120 species having previously been recorded. Babur observed enormous flocks of greater flamingoes at the lake; their numbers in recent years have varied between 0 and 9000. The wetlands were once a critical stopover for the central migratory population of Siberian cranes, but these have not been sighted at the lake since 1986. In 1974, the Afghani government proclaimed a Waterfowl and Flamingo Sanctuary around the lake, causing considerable resentment among the locals; conservation efforts ended with the Soviet invasion in 1979 and have not been restarted since.

Important Bird Area
A 27,000 ha area, encompassing the lake and its immediate surrounds, has been designated an Important Bird Area (IBA) by BirdLife International because it supports populations of greylag geese, common pochards, greater flamingos, Siberian cranes, grey herons, great white pelicans, black-winged stilts, Kentish plovers, slender-billed gulls and gull-billed terns.

References

Lakes of Afghanistan
Wetlands of Afghanistan
Landforms of Ghazni Province
Important Bird Areas of Afghanistan